The 2023 National Football League, known for sponsorship reasons as the Allianz National Football League, is the 92nd staging of the National Football League (NFL), an annual Gaelic football tournament for county teams. Thirty-one county teams from the island of Ireland, plus London, compete; Kilkenny do not participate.

For the first time ever, there is no Leinster team in the top tier of the league after Dublin and Kildare were both relegated on the last day of the 2022 season.

For the 2023 season, league position is also important for the All-Ireland Championship; 7 or 8 of the teams that reach the All-Ireland round robin stage will be selected based on league finish.

Format

League structure

In the top division, Division 1, teams compete to become the National Football League (NFL) champions. The top two teams qualify for the NFL Final, with the winners crowned NFL champions.

The 2023 National Football League consists of four divisions of eight teams. Each team plays every other team in its division once. Two points are awarded for a win, one point is awarded for a draw and none are awarded for a loss.

Teams compete for promotion and relegation to a higher or lower league. In Divisions 2, 3 and 4, the first and second-places teams are promoted, while the bottom two teams of divisions 1, 2 and 3 are relegated .

Tiebreakers for league ranking
As per the Official GAA Guide - Part 1 - Section 6.21 - 

If two teams in the same group are equal on points on completion of the league phase, the following tie-breaking criteria are applied:
Where two teams only are involved - the outcome of the meeting of the two teams in the previous game in the Competition;

If three or more teams in the same group are equal on points on completion of the league phase, the following tie-breaking criteria are applied:
Scoring Difference (subtracting the total scores against from total scores for);
Highest Total Score For;
A Play-Off.

In the event that two teams or more finish with equal points, but have been affected by a disqualification, loss of game on a proven objection, retirement or walkover, the tie shall be decided by the following means:
Score Difference from the games in which only the teams involved, (teams tied on points), have played each other. (subtracting the total Scores Against from total Scores For)
Highest Total Score For, in which only the teams involved, have played each other, and have finished equal in (i)
A Play-Off

Division 1

Table

Matches

Round 1

Round 2

Round 3

Round 4

Round 5

Round 6

Round 7

Final

Top scorers

Overall

In a single game

Division 2

Table

Matches

Round 1

Round 2

Round 3

Round 4

Round 5

Round 6

Round 7

Final

Top scorers

Overall

In a single game

Division 3

Table

Matches

Round 1

Round 2

Round 3

Round 4

Round 5

Round 6

Round 7

Final

Top scorers

Overall

In a single game

Division 4

Table

Matches

Round 1

Round 2

Round 3

Round 4

Round 5

Round 6

Round 7

Final

Top scorers

Overall

In a single game

References

 
National Football League (Ireland) seasons
National Football League